The Park Boulevard Bridge (originally called 78th Avenue Bridge) is a double-leaf bascule bridge that crosses the Narrows, part of the Gulf Intracoastal Waterway, connecting the barrier islands of Indian Shores and the mainland of Seminole, Florida. The bridge carries Park Boulevard, part of CR 694. The bridge was built in 1981. It had a toll, but ten years later, the tolls were removed .

See also 
Dunedin Causeway
Clearwater Memorial Causeway
Sand Key Bridge
Belleair Causeway
Indian Rocks Causeway
Tom Stuart Causeway
John's Pass Bridge
Treasure Island Causeway
Corey Causeway
Pinellas Bayway

References 

Transportation in Pinellas County, Florida
Road bridges in Florida
Bascule bridges in the United States